Bill Buchan Sr. was a Scottish born American sailor and yacht design, boat-builder. He was the father of Olympic sailor Bill Buchan Jr. and grand father of Olympic sailor Carl Buchan. He won the 1955 Clifford Day Mallory Cup. He was together with his son John Buchan designer of the Buchan 37 yacht.

References

American male sailors (sport)
American yacht designers
Star class sailors